Cross Creeks National Wildlife Refuge is a part of the U.S. system of National Wildlife Refuges located along the Lake Barkley impoundment of the Cumberland River in Stewart County, Tennessee near Dover, covering .  It provides habitat for a wide variety of waterfowl and aquatic plant life in what is a largely wetlands environment.  Cross Creeks is the only National Wildlife Refuge located entirely in Middle Tennessee as of 2006.

External links
 Official website U.S. Fish and Wildlife Service

National Wildlife Refuges in Tennessee
Protected areas of Stewart County, Tennessee
Dover, Tennessee
Wetlands of Tennessee
Landforms of Stewart County, Tennessee
1962 establishments in Tennessee
Protected areas established in 1962